In sewing, binding is used as both a noun and a verb to refer to finishing a seam or hem of a garment, usually by rolling or pressing then stitching on an edging or trim (sewing).

Seams